Adventures by Mail is a company that published play-by-mail (PBM) games. The company was founded in 1981. It published various PBM games including Beyond the Stellar Empire, It's a Crime, and Monster Island.

History
The company—based in Cohoes, NY—began publishing PBM games in 1981. In 1982, the company hired another gamemaster, Michael Popolizio.  In the January–February 1985 issue of Paper Mayhem magazine, the company announced a significant expansion of one of their main PBM games, Beyond the Stellar Empire (BSE) had occurred the prior December. They asserted in 1993 that they were the largest PBM company in the United States. At the time, their game offerings included BSE, It's a Crime, Monster Island, and Quest.

In 1983, readers of The Space Gamer voted Adventures by Mail the top PBM publisher of the year, due to the popularity of Warboid World and Beyond the Stellar Empire.

Published games
 Beyond the Stellar Empire
 Capitol
 Crasimoff's World
 Isle of Crowns
 It's a Crime
 Monster Island
 Smuggler's Run
 Quest: World of Kharne
Warboid World

See also
 List of play-by-mail games

References

Bibliography
 
 
 
  Games listing is on page 52 with codes for game companies which are listed on pages 50–51.
 

Play-by-mail game publishing companies
Publishing companies established in 1981